This is an incomplete list of radio stations in Luxembourg. Luxembourg, as a multilingual country, has a range of media dedicated to each of the official languages: Luxembourgish, French, and German. In addition, there are also radio stations that broadcast in English and in Portuguese.

Luxembourg language 
Radio Salopette: Adult Contemporary "Your Station With Style, Good Mood And The Best Music There Is"

German language 
RTL Radio: Adult Contemporary "The Best Hits of All Times"
RPR1: Adult Contemporary

French language 
Bel RTL: Adult Contemporary
L'Essentiel Radio: Adult contemporary
Radio Contact: Hit Music "Whatever Happens, Feel Good"
RTL: Adult Contemporary

English language 
ARA City Radio: Rock

Portuguese language 
Radio Amizade: Latin Music
Radio Latina: Latin Music
Radio Lusitana: Musica Portuguesa wwww.lusitanafm.lu

External links
 Radio stations in Luxembourg (Radiomap.eu)

Radio stations in Luxembourg
Luxembourg